Amblysaphes striatus is a species of beetle in the family Cerambycidae, the only species in the genus Amblysaphes.

References

Acanthoderini